Puntigrus is a genus of cyprinids native to Southeast Asia.

Etymology 
The name Puntigrus is derived from the first syllable of the cyprinid genus Puntius and "tigrus" (to allude to the Latin "tigris" meaning "tiger").

Species
There are currently five recognized species in this genus:
 Puntigrus anchisporus (Vaillant, 1902)
 Puntigrus navjotsodhii (H. H. Tan, 2012)
 Puntigrus partipentazona (Fowler, 1934)
 Puntigrus pulcher (Rendahl (de), 1922)
 Puntigrus tetrazona (Bleeker, 1855)

Conservation status
As of 2020, the IUCN lists all five fish in the genus Puntigrus as species of Least concern.

References

 
Freshwater fish genera
Taxa named by Maurice Kottelat